The T Craft-class patrol vessels are a class of inshore patrol boat currently in service with the South African Navy. Comprising three vessels, the class was constructed in South Africa and entered service in 1992. Known just as T craft or by their pennant numbers until 2003 when the vessels received new names.

Design 

These boats are twin-hulled catamarans of glass-reinforced plastic (GRP) sandwich construction, with a complement of 16 personnel including one officer. The boats are propelled by two Hamilton water-jets powered by two ADE 444 Tl 12V diesel engines creating . Each vessel possesses a Racal-Decca I-band surface search radar unit and a single  heavy Browning machine gun. Each boat is designed to carry a small seaborne complement of commandos as well as a rigid-hulled inflatable boat in the stern well in order to board other vessels at sea.

History 

Three vessels were ordered in mid-1991, and were built by T Craft International in Cape Town. The first vessel was commissioned into the South African Navy as P1552 in June 1992. The second vessel was commissioned as P1553 in June 1996 and the third as P1554 in December 1996. Three vessels of this type were also built for Israel in 1997. In 2003, the three vessels were given new names, keeping their old names as pennant numbers. P1152 became SAS Tobie (P1552), P1553 became SAS Tern (P1553) and P1554 became SAS Tekwane (P1554).

References

Ships of the South African Navy
Patrol boat classes